Below is a list of California Historical Landmarks organized by county.

List

 Alameda County
 Alpine County
 Amador County
 Butte County
 Calaveras County
 Colusa County
 Contra Costa County
 Del Norte County
 El Dorado County
 Fresno County
 Glenn County
 Humboldt County
 Imperial County
 Inyo County
 Kern County
 Kings County
 Lake County
 Lassen County
 Los Angeles County
 Madera County

 Marin County
 Mariposa County
 Mendocino County
 Merced County
 Modoc County
 Mono County
 Monterey County
 Napa County
 Nevada County
 Orange County
 Placer County
 Plumas County
 Riverside County
 Sacramento County
 San Benito County
 San Bernardino County
 San Diego County
 San Francisco County
 San Joaquin County

 San Luis Obispo County
 San Mateo County
 Santa Barbara County
 Santa Clara County
 Santa Cruz County
 Shasta County
 Sierra County
 Siskiyou County
 Solano County
 Sonoma County
 Stanislaus County
 Sutter County
 Tehama County
 Trinity County
 Tulare County
 Tuolumne County
 Ventura County
 Yolo County
 Yuba County

See also
 National Register of Historic Places listings in California
 List of National Historic Landmarks in California

References

External links
 California Office of Historic Preservation website
 Official list of California Historical Sites

 02
.
.
.
.
Landmarks
Heritage registers in California